Stockton Community Building, also known as the Trent-Sallee American Legion Post #230, is a historic community centre located at Stockton, Cedar County, Missouri. It was built in 1933-1934 through a grant from the Civil Works Administration. It is a two-story, rectangular building constructed of native limestone in a plain ashlar design.

It was listed on the National Register of Historic Places in 1998.

References

Clubhouses on the National Register of Historic Places in Missouri
Cultural infrastructure completed in 1934
Buildings and structures in Cedar County, Missouri
National Register of Historic Places in Cedar County, Missouri
1934 establishments in Missouri
Civil Works Administration
New Deal in Missouri